Saucier is a census-designated place (CDP) in Harrison County, Mississippi, United States. It is part of the Gulfport–Biloxi Metropolitan Statistical Area. The population was 1,342 at the 2010 census.

History 
Saucier is located on the Kansas City Southern Railway and was once home to a sawmill, drugstore, confectionery store, and five general stores.

A post office first began operation under the name Saucier in 1893.

Geography 
Saucier is located at  (30.625130, -89.138438).

Demographics

2020 census 

As of the 2020 United States census, there were 1,077 people, 429 households, and 292 families residing in the CDP.

2000 census 
As of the census of 2000, there were 1,303 people, 478 households, and 367 families residing in the CDP. The population density was 186.2 people per square mile (71.9/km). There were 507 housing units at an average density of 72.4/sq mi (28.0/km). The racial makeup of the CDP was 97.47% White, 0.69% African American, 0.15% Native American, 0.23% Asian, 0.15% Pacific Islander, 0.15% from other races, and 1.15% from two or more races. Hispanic or Latino of any race were 1.38% of the population.

There were 478 households, out of which 38.3% had children under the age of 18 living with them, 59.8% were married couples living together, 9.6% had a female householder with no husband present, and 23.2% were non-families. 16.1% of all households were made up of individuals, and 5.2% had someone living alone who was 65 years of age or older. The average household size was 2.73 and the average family size was 3.04.

In the CDP, the population was spread out, with 28.5% under the age of 18, 10.0% from 18 to 24, 30.9% from 25 to 44, 23.6% from 45 to 64, and 7.0% who were 65 years of age or older. The median age was 34 years. For every 100 females, there were 103.3 males. For every 100 females age 18 and over, there were 106.0 males.

The median income for a household in the CDP was $37,000, and the median income for a family was $44,167. Males had a median income of $30,099 versus $26,875 for females. The per capita income for the CDP was $15,164. About 21.5% of families and 22.1% of the population were below the poverty line, including 31.2% of those under age 18 and none of those age 65 or over.

Education 
Saucier is served by the Harrison County School District.

The public library is the Saucier Children's Library. It is a part of the Harrison County Library System.

Media 
Saucier's local newspaper is The Sun Herald. Saucier is part of Mississippi Gulf Coast Radio and Television stations Market Area.

Notable people 
 Joe James, racecar driver.
 Israel Broussard, actor.

In popular culture 
In 2004, The Ladykillers, a remake of the original British movie, was set in Saucier.

References 

Census-designated places in Harrison County, Mississippi
Census-designated places in Mississippi
Gulfport–Biloxi metropolitan area